Gessner is a surname. Notable people with the surname include:

Conrad Gessner (1516–1565), Swiss naturalist, bibliographer, botanist, physician and classical linguist
David Gessner (born 1961), American essayist, memoirist, nature writer, editor, and cartoonist
Johannes Gessner (1709–1790), Swiss mathematician, physicist, botanist, mineralogist and physician
Nicolas Gessner (born 1931), film director
Salomon Gessner (1730–1788), poet and painter

See also
Gesner

German-language surnames